Mersin İdmanyurdu (also Mersin İdman Yurdu, Mersin İY, or MİY) Sports Club; located in Mersin, east Mediterranean coast of Turkey in 2010–2011. The 2010–11 season was the 6th season of Mersin İdmanyurdu football team in TFF First League, the second level division in Turkey since 2001–02. MİY has taken place 33rd time in the second-level football division since its foundation in 1963–64. At the end of the season the team finished the league at first place and promoted to Spor–Toto Super League after 28 seasons.

Ali Kahramanlı was president of the club. Yüksel Yeşilova was head coach at the start of the season. After 8th round Nurullah Sağlam took over the position. Goalkeeper and team captain Kerem İnan was the most appeared player with 32 appearances, while Adem Büyük, who was loaned in the mid-season became the season top goalscorer with 10 goals.

Pre-season
Pre-season preparation games resulted as follows (at Kızılcahamam camp):
 15.07.2010. MİY-Antalyaspor (then Turkish Süper lig team): 0–0,
 18.07.2010. MİY-Azal (Azerbaijan Super League team): 1–1.
 22.07.2010. MİY-Mogan (Azerbaijan Super League team): 1–2.

2010–11 TFF First League participation
TFF First League was played as "Bank Asya Birinci Lig" in 2010–11 due to sponsorship reasons. 17 teams attended. The winners and runners-up were promoted to 2011–12 Süper Lig. The third team to be promoted was determined through promotion play-off games. Bottom two teams were relegated to 2011–12 TFF Second League. MİY attended 6th time to the league in its 10th season and finished at top, gaining direct promotion to 2011–12 Süper Lig at the end of the season.

Results summary
Mersin İdmanyurdu (MİY) 2010–11 TFF First League season league summary:

Sources: 2010–11 TFF First League pages.

League table
Mersin İdmanyurdu (MİY) 2010–11 TFF First League season standing in league table after normal season:

Results by round
Results of games MİY played in 2010–11 TFF First League by rounds:

First half
Mersin İdmanyurdu (MİY) 2010–11 TFF First League season first half game reports is shown in the following table.
Kick off times are in EET and EEST.

Sources: 2010–11 Süper Lig pages.

Second half
Mersin İdmanyurdu (MİY) 2010–11 TFF First League season second half game reports is shown in the following table. 
Kick off times are in EET and EEST.

Sources: 2010–11 Süper Lig pages.

2010–11 Turkish Cup participation
2009–10 Turkish Cup was played with 71 teams in three stages. The 49th Cup was played as Ziraat Türkiye Kupası for sponsorship reasons. In the first stage 2 elimination rounds and a play-off round were played in one-leg elimination system. In the second stage 20 remaining teams played one-led round-robin group games in 4 groups, 5 teams in each group. In the third stage; quarter- and semifinals and finals played again in one-leg elimination rule. Final game was played at a neutral venue. MİY attended to 49th Turkish Cup in 2010–11 Turkish Cup at second round. First round played among teams from TFF Second League and TFF Third League in 2009–2010 season. 2009–10 TFF First League teams started from round two. MİY was eliminated at play-offs by Beşiktaş who later became winners of the Cup for 9th time.

Cup track
The drawings and results Mersin İdmanyurdu (MİY) followed in 2010–11 Turkish Cup are shown in the following table.

Note: In the above table 'Score' shows For and Against goals whether the match played at home or not.

Game details
Mersin İdmanyurdu (MİY) 2010–11 Turkish Cup game reports is shown in the following table.
Kick off times are in EET and EEST.

Source: 2010–11 Ziraat Turkish Cup pages.

Management
 Club address was: Hamidiye Mah., İsmet İnönü Blv., Sevim Çalışkan Apt. No: 3/3, Mersin.

Club management
 Executive committee: President : Ali Kahramanlı since September 2008. Vice-president: Senan İdin. Deputy vice-presidents: Ayhan Erdem, Beşir Acar, Şerafettin Kadooğlu. Football division manager:  Mehmet Hanifi Işık. Treasurer: Nafiz Deniz. General Secretary: Ali Sönmez. Member in charge of infrastructure and club director: Salih Baysal. Members: Mehmet H. Serdaroğlu, Cahit Yürümez, Naif Yavuz, İbrahim Çakar, Hanifi Çelik.

Mersin İdmanyurdu Sports Club president and managerial board members are elected by general vote of club members. Last election was held in September 2008. Mersin İdmanyurdu football team has finished 2009–10 season in 13th place in TFF First League. The team was guaranteed non-relegation only at the last match of the season. Therefore, president Ali Kahramanlı declared an extraordinary general meeting, in order to provide support for the club. However, later he renounced that meeting will be held during the half-season due to lack of time to prepare team for next season.

Coaching team
 Before 17 October 2010: Head coach: Yüksel Yeşilova General manager: Serkan Damla. Trainer: Tekin İncebaldır. Goalkeeper trainer: Okan Kopan. Tactician: Dorel Chiriac. Analist : Mehmet Erben Arslan.
 After 20 October 2010: Head coach: Nurullah Sağlam Trainer: İsmet Savcılıoğlu. Goalkeeper trainer: Sadık Öztürk. General manager: Serkan Damla.

2010–11 Mersin İdmanyurdu head coaches

Note: Only official games were included.

2010–11 squad
Appearances, goals and cards count for 2010–11 TFF First League and 2010–11 Turkish Cup games. Serial penalties were not included in goal stats. Kit numbers were allowed to select by players. 18 players appeared in each game roster, three to be replaced. Only the players who appeared in game rosters were included and listed in order of appearance.

Sources: TFF club page and maçkolik team page.

A2 team
A2 League was played in two groups, one with 20 teams and the second with 17 teams (originally second group was planned to be consisting of 18 teams, but after dismissal of Ankaraspor group was played by 17 teams). Süper Lig, Bank Asya First league and two TFF Second League teams which meet the conditions participated. Mersin İdmanyurdu took place in Group B.

League position

Results by round

See also
 Football in Turkey
 2010–11 TFF First League
 2010–11 Turkish Cup

Notes and references

2010-11
Turkish football clubs 2010–11 season